Lupinus apertus, summit lupine, is a species of flowering plant from the order of Lamiales which is native to Nevada and California.

References

External links
Jepson Herbarium

apertus
Flora of California
Flora of Nevada
Flora without expected TNC conservation status